The 1997 German motorcycle Grand Prix was the ninth round of the 1997 Grand Prix motorcycle racing season. It took place on 20 July 1997 at the Nürburgring.

500 cc classification

250 cc classification

125 cc classification

References

German motorcycle Grand Prix
German
Motorcycle Grand Prix